José Hernández is a station on Line D of the Buenos Aires Underground. The station was opened on 31 May 1997 as the western terminus of the extension of the line from Ministro Carranza. On 21 June 1999 the line was extended further west to Juramento.

References

External links

Buenos Aires Underground stations
1997 establishments in Argentina